Bödexen is a quarter of Höxter, in the east of North Rhine-Westphalia, Germany. The village is 203 metres above sea level. In the north of Bödexen is the Köterberg the highest mountain in Weser Uplands with 495 metres. The brook Saumer flows through Bödexen. With an expanse of 21,58 km² and 960 residents Bödexen is the third smallest urban district of Höxter.

History
One suggests a grave mound on the autumn mountain originating stone axe that the residence existed Bödexen since the Stone Age. Documented Bödexen was first mentioned in the Corvey traditions. It says under number 117: Marcbodo and Giki and son Hunwardi in place of the father transferred / donated four farms, two in Bodikeshus (un) and two located elsewhere for the salvation of the Hoger and his father Marc Ward and mother Ricsuit . Witnesses Beuo, Aldmer, Anulo, Wulfger, Pumi, and twenty others. The donation was apparently before the year 836, because of the additional ad reliquias sanctorum martirum Stephani atque Viti.. (Near the bones of St. Stephen and St. Vitus ...) is missing. This saint was the Abbey Church at Corvey dedicated to 840th.

The name Bödexen is Saxon origin. In the 9th century was the name still Bodikeshusun (house / yard of the Bodo). After two centuries, Bodikessen fact, the Tithe Bishop of Paderborn, Corvey gave the monastery. In 1700 was from Bodikessen at a population and building census Böx. This led to the passage of time the present name Bödexen.

Demographic  development

References 

Villages in North Rhine-Westphalia